Parliamentary elections were held in Sudan on 2 and 25 November 1953, prior to the implementation of home rule. The result was a victory for the National Unionist Party, which won 51 of the 97 seats in House of Representatives. The NUP also obtained a majority in the Senate, where they won 21 of the 30 indirectly elected seats  (elected by local and provincial councils) and 10 of the 20 members were nominated to the Senate by the British Governor-General. Although the Umma Party and some of the British press alleged that Egypt had interfered in the election, it was generally seen as free and fair.

Results

House of Representatives

Senate

References

Sudan
Elections in Sudan
1953 in Sudan
National Legislature (Sudan)
Election and referendum articles with incomplete results
November 1953 events in Africa